The Colorado Freeride Festival is the largest freeride bike contest in the United States. It is held annually at Trestle Bike Park in Winter Park, Colorado spanning four days throughout the month of July and includes over 800 international riders. Participating riders compete in events such as Downhill mountain biking, Cross-country cycling, and Freeride aka. slopestyle. The Festival was suspended for 2018 due to a conflict with construction projects in the area.

Results 
Source:

Men

Women

References

Mountain biking events in the United States